Al Bustan may refer to:
 Al Bustan, Oman
 Al Bustan, Saudi Arabia
 Al-Bustan, Syria
 King's Garden (historical)
 King's Garden (Silwan)

See also
Bostan (disambiguation)